Mahesh Bhupathi and Max Mirnyi were the defending champions but did not compete that year.

Juan Ignacio Chela and Gastón Gaudio won in the final 6–2, 6–1 against František Čermák and Leoš Friedl.

Seeds

  František Čermák /  Leoš Friedl (final)
  Massimo Bertolini /  Robbie Koenig (quarterfinals)
  Petr Pála /  Radek Štěpánek (first round)
  Scott Humphries /  Jared Palmer (first round)

Draw

External links
 2004 Estoril Open Men's Doubles draw

2004 Men's Doubles
Doubles
Estoril Open